Żar may refer to:

 Żar, Łódź Voivodeship, village in Poland
 Żar (mountain), mountain in Poland

See also 
 Zar (disambiguation)